Stephanie Macdonald  (born 15 October 1966 in Lewisham, London) is a British architect. She co-founded architecture firm 6a architects with Tom Emerson in 2001. She was appointed Officer of the Order of the British Empire (OBE) in the 2021 New Year Honours for services to architecture.

Early life and education 
The eldest of twelve children, Stephanie Macdonald was born in Lewisham, in the outskirts of London. She attended schools in Purley until leaving at a young age to work as a clerk in banking and insurance in the City of London. She completed her Art Foundation through night school at Croydon College of Art, while working nightshifts at a supermarket. Afterwards, she studied environmental art at Portsmouth School of Art, where she began to develop an interest in architecture. Following her interest in art, she enrolled at Glasgow School of Art, but changed to architecture in the second year moving to the Mackintosh School of Architecture.

In 1994, Macdonald embarked on postgraduate studies at the Royal College of Art, where she met her life and business partner Tom Emerson. It was there that they met artist Richard Wentworth, who would become a fundamental influence on their architecture practices. She obtained her diploma at the University of North London (now London Metropolitan University) in 1997 where she was taught by Caruso St John.

Architecture career 
In 2001, Macdonald and Emerson founded 6a architects. Their work was brought to prominence with the renovation of the grade-I listed Raven Row gallery in East London and the fire station at the South London Gallery. Subsequent projects have included the MK Gallery in Milton Keynes, Juergen Teller’s Studio and international commissions such as two mixed-use towers in Hamburg, Germany. 6a architects projects often involve collaborations with art galleries, cultural institutions and artists, which Macdonald explains results from their connections with artists, writers and designers whilst at art and architecture school.

Macdonald has spoken about her experiences as a woman in architecture, stating that ‘the profession is not made in women’s image’ but notes that a lot is being done to counteract this. She was shortlisted in shortlisted in the Architect of the Year category for her work on Cowan Court in the 2018 Women in Architecture Awards. She was also listed as one of the Evening Standard London's most influential people 2018 in the category of architecture and was featured in a 2021 article on women architects in the Daily Telegraph.

Personal life 
Stephanie Macdonald lives in London with her partner Tom Emerson and their son Laurie, born in 1999.

Projects 

 Oki-ni, Savile Row, London, 2001
 Raven Row, Contemporary Art Exhibition Centre, Spitalfields, London, 2009
 South London Gallery, London, 2010
 Fashion Galleries, Victoria & Albert Museum, London, 2012
 Romney's House, Hampstead, London, 2012
 Tree House, London, London, 2013
 Façade for Paul Smith, Albemarle Street, London, 2013
 Studio for Juergen Teller, London, 2016
 Cowan Court, Churchill College Cambridge, 2015–16
 Black Stone Building, London, 2017
 Coastal House, Devon, 2017
 Blue Mountain School, London, 2018
 MK Gallery, Milton Keynes, 2019

Bibliography 

 Never Modern by 6a architects and Irénée Scalbert, Park Books, Zurich, 2013, 
 6a architects 2009–17, El Croquis, no. 192, 2017,

References 

British architects
Women architects
1960s births
Living people
Royal College of Art